Nero Wolfe is a fictional detective character.

Nero Wolfe also may refer to:
Nero Wolfe (film), a 1977 ABC TV movie starring Thayer David and Tom Mason
Nero Wolfe (1981 TV series), an NBC TV series starring William Conrad and Lee Horsley
 Nero Wolfe (1982 radio series), a 1982 Canadian Broadcasting Corporation radio series starring Mavor Moore
Nero Wolfe (2001 TV series), also known as A Nero Wolfe Mystery a 2001–2002 A&E television network series starring Maury Chaykin and Timothy Hutton

See also 
The Adventures of Nero Wolfe, a 1943–1944 ABC radio series
The Amazing Nero Wolfe, a 1945 Mutual radio series starring Francis X. Bushman
The New Adventures of Nero Wolfe, a 1950–1951 NBC radio series starring Sydney Greenstreet